Struer may refer to:
 Struer Municipality, a place in Denmark
 Struer, Denmark, a town in the municipality
 Struer Vandtårn
 Struer Idrætspark
 Holger F. Struer
 Struers A/S